Looking in the Shadows is the fourth studio album by British alternative rock group the Raincoats, released in 1996 on 17 June by Rough Trade and on 3 June by DGC. It was the band's first album in 12 years (after 1984's Moving).

Production
The album was produced by Ed Buller. The Raincoats' original members, Gina Birch and Ana da Silva, had to relearn their instruments prior to recording Looking in the Shadows.

Critical reception
The Hartford Courant wrote: "With a bent toward electronic sounds and a playful, revealing manner in the lyrics, the band succeeds in creating music that reflects not some sort of nostalgia for what the Raincoats used to be but considerable understanding in what they came to be." The Washington Post wrote that "the Raincoats may be grown up now, but on songs like 'Love a Loser' they still juxtapose harsh and sweet as bracingly as ever."

Track listing
Tracks 1, 3, 5, 7, 9 and 12 were written by Ana da Silva, the remainder by Gina Birch.

"Only Tonight" – 3:30
"Don't Be Mean" – 3:59
"Forgotten Words" – 3:36
"Pretty" – 4:17
"Truth is Hard" – 2:57
"Babydog" – 5:05
"You Ask Why" – 3:58
"57 Ways to End It All" – 5:31
"So Damn Early" – 4:12
"You Kill Me" – 3:58
"Love a Loser" – 3:30
"Looking in the Shadows" – 3:14

Personnel
The Raincoats
Gina Birch – vocals, bass, guitar, feedback, fuzz guitar, distortion
Ana da Silva – vocals, bass, rhythm guitar, keyboards, 12-string guitar, slide guitar, sruthi, design
Anne Wood – bass, guitar, violin
with:
Ed Buller – piano, Moog synthesizer
Heather Dunn – bass, drums
Simon Fisher Turner – vocals on "Love a Loser"
Pete Shelley – vocals on "Love a Loser"
Technical
Gary Stout – programming, computer editing
Shirley O'Loughlin – photography
Maria Mochnacz – photography

References

1996 albums
The Raincoats albums
Albums produced by Ed Buller
Geffen Records albums
Rough Trade Records albums